Zinga may refer to:

Places 
 Zinga, Burma—in Kyaukki Township, Bango division
 Zinga, Haut-Mbomou in Obo district, Haut-Mbomou region of the Central African Republic
 Zinga, Lobaye in Mongoumba district, Lobaye region of the Central African Republic
 Zinga, Democratic Republic of the Congo in Kivu region
 Zinga, Ghana in Chiana-Paga district, Upper East Ghana
 Zinga, Tanzania in Bagamoyo, Pwani Region
 Zinga, historical region and frazione of Casabona, Italy

People with the surname
 Andrea Zinga, American politician and journalist
 Queen Nzinga (pronounced Zinga) ruler of what later became Angola an important 17th century ruler

Other uses 
 Zinga (leafhopper), a genus of leafhoppers in the tribe Erythroneurini
 Zinga virus, a Rift Valley fever strain
 Zinga, the film Song of Freedoms black dockworker character.
 Zinga, Holiday World & Splashin' Safari's eight-story tall water slide
 Zynga, a social network game developer.
 Nizatidine, by the trade name Zinga

See also 
 Nzinga (disambiguation)